WPAB (550 AM, "550 Ponce") is a radio station broadcasting a Spanish News/Talk format. Licensed to Ponce, Puerto Rico, it serves the greater Puerto Rico area.  The station is currently owned by WPAB, Inc. Its call letters, PAB, stand for "Puerto Rican American Broadcasting" corporation.
 The station is shared with translator station W226CS 93.1 FM in Bayamon, covering the entire metropolitan area.

Significance
The radio station is "one of the most important radio stations in Puerto Rico", and the one that introduced Puerto Rico to the news and interviews format.

History
The station was founded in August 1940 by Miguel Soltero Palermo and Alfonso Giménez Aguayo. It had its first studios on Calle Leon in the Ponce Historic Zone, then moved to more spacious quarters on Calle Villa in the 1950s. It is located at 1831 Ave. Eduardo Ruberté, in Barrio Playa, Ponce, Puerto Rico.

Translator stations

References

External links

News and talk radio stations in Puerto Rico
Radio stations established in 1940
PAB
1940 establishments in Puerto Rico